The Nude Tour was a greatest-hits concert tour by American recording artist Prince. While his previous tour had drawn critical praise, the high cost of the concert tour production made it a financial disappointment; thus, Prince eliminated much of the excessiveness of the previous tour to be more financially viable. To make the tour as cost effective as possible, Prince decided not to tour in the U.S. this time, and thus he did not return to performing in North America until the Act I Tour in 1993.

Background
Unlike the previous year's Lovesexy Tour, the Nude Tour promised a stripped-down, back to basics concert that saw Prince eliminate many of the excessive and expensive set designs that were produced for the Sign o' the Times and Lovesexy tours, thus the "Nude" moniker. The setlist was reduced to a limited number of his hits from the 1980s with a few tracks from the Batman and then-forthcoming Graffiti Bridge albums, resulting in all the songs being played in their entirety and much shorter shows. In a move to promote a more youth-friendly image, as well as cut costs, Prince chose to eliminate the veteran horn section from the band. According to academic Joseph Vogel, "The new image was clear: Prince wanted to present as young, black, and hip."

Although Prince had previously expressed negative views toward rap music on The Black Album (which, at the time, had not been released but had been widely bootlegged), he included rapping by Tony Mosley (known as Tony M.) in the song "The Future" during the Nude Tour.

Opening act
 Jenny Morris
Mavis Staples
 The Naked Mazurs
Loïs Lane

Band lineup
New Power Generation
Levi Seacer Jr.:Bass
Miko Weaver: Guitar
Michael Bland: Drums
Doctor Fink: Keyboards
Rosie Gaines: Vocals / Dance
Tony M.: Rap Vocals / Dance
Kirk Johnson: Vocals / Dance / Percussion
Damon Dickson: Dance 

Tony M., Kirk Johnson, and Damon Dickson were referred to as the Game Boyz.

Set list

This setlist is based on an average setlist of the entire, it does not represent the entire tour.
"DAT Intro" (prerecorded samples of various hits)
"The Future"
"1999"
"Housequake" (contains excerpts of "Sexy Dancer")
"Kiss" (contains excerpts of "Let's Jam It")
"Purple Rain"
"Take Me with U"
"Alphabet St." (contains excerpts of "It Takes Two" and "The Latest Fashion")
"The Question of U" (contains excerpts of "Electric Man")
"Controversy"  (contains excerpts of "D.M.S.R.") 
"Do Me, Baby"
"Ain't No Way" (Rosie Gaines solo)
"Nothing Compares 2 U"
"Batdance"
"Partyman" (contains excerpts of "What Have You Done for Me Lately")
Encore
"Baby I'm a Star" (contains excerpts of "Respect")

Shows

Cancelled shows

Notes

References

Prince (musician) concert tours
1990 concert tours